Jakub Dziółka (born 21 November 1980) is a Polish former footballer. He was one of the tallest footballers in Ekstraklasa in 2007/2008 season.

After his playing career he became a manager.

In the years 2015-2018 he was the coach of Skra Częstochowa, in the years 2018-2019 he worked at the staff of GKS Katowice, and in the years 2019-2021 at the staff of MKS Cracovia. From July 5, 2021, he is the coach of Skra again.

See also
Football in Poland
List of football clubs in Poland

References

External links
 
 
 

Living people
1980 births
Polish footballers
Polish football managers
Association football defenders
Szczakowianka Jaworzno players
Polonia Bytom players
Sportspeople from Chorzów